Fatality is the name given to a gameplay feature in the Mortal Kombat series of fighting video games, in which the victor of the final round in a match inflicts a brutal and gruesome finishing move onto their defeated opponent. Prompted by the announcer saying "Finish Him/Her", players have a short time window to execute a Fatality by entering a specific button and joystick combination, while positioned at a specific distance from the opponent. The Fatality and its derivations are notable features of the Mortal Kombat series and have caused a large cultural impact and controversies.

Conception
The origins of the Fatality concept has been traced back to several violent Asian martial arts media. In The Street Fighter (1974), a Japanese martial arts film, Sonny Chiba performs x-ray fatality finishing moves, which at the time was seen as a gimmick to distinguish it from other martial arts films. In the Japanese shōnen manga and anime series Fist of the North Star, the protagonist Kenshiro performs gory fatalities in the form of finishing moves which consist of attacking pressure points that cause heads and bodies to explode. The Japanese seinen manga and anime series Riki-Oh (1988 debut), along with its Hong Kong martial arts film adaptation Story of Ricky (1991), featured gory fatalities in the form of finishing moves similar to those that later appeared in Mortal Kombat.

While creating Mortal Kombat, Ed Boon and John Tobias started with the idea of Street Fighter II style system and retained many of its conventions but tweaked others. The most notable additions were graphic blood effects, more brutal fighting techniques, and especially the fatal finishing moves (this was a novelty as the traditional fighting games ended with the loser simply knocked unconscious and the victor posing for the players). According to Boon, it started with an idea to enable the player to hit a dizzied opponent at the end of the match with a "free hit", and that idea "quickly evolved into something nasty." Tobias recalled it differently: "Our first idea was to use them as a finishing move for final boss Shang Tsung, who was going to pull out his sword and behead his opponent. Then we thought, 'What if the player could do that to his opponent?'" Tobias and former Midway Games programmer Mark Turmell stated that initially no one at Midway expected players to find the Fatalities in the game. Tobias said: "When we watched players react to the Fatalities, we knew we had no choice but to give them more."

Gameplay 
Unlike special moves, a Fatality may require certain distances and quick button sequences in order to achieve the desired result. Usually, every character has their own special Fatality that must be performed at a certain distance from the opponent, the three distances being: close (the finishing move would not work unless the player is right next to the opponent), sweep (the player should stand a step or two away from the opponent, but still within the distance that a sweeping low kick should hit), and far (at least one jump's length away from the opponent).

Each character has signature Fatalities. Traditionally for the main and important characters of the games their Fatalities are usually a reflection of either their storyline or their special abilities: e.g., Sub-Zero's Fatalities have traditionally involved the use of his powers of ice, whereas Scorpion's storyline of a hellspawn ninja spectre involves the use of setting someone ablaze or using his famous spear. The number of individual Fatalities varies depending upon the game; while characters in Mortal Kombat and Mortal Kombat: Deadly Alliance had only one, Mortal Kombat II and Mortal Kombat 3 and its updates (Mortal Kombat Trilogy and Ultimate Mortal Kombat 3) featured as many as four.

Cultural impact 

The Fatalities were featured in ScrewAttack's "Top 10 OMGWTF Moments" due to the competition it gave to other games including Street Fighter II and how it popularized the arcades, as well as in machinima.com's list of top ten gaming memes. The 2012 film Wreck-It Ralph shows a cyborg resembling Mortal Kombats Kano performing his signature heart-ripping Fatality move on a zombie.

By 1996, Mortal Kombats creation had become a generic gaming term for a lethal finishing move in any game,Best Fatalities in Video Games , 1UP.com, May 13, 2010 including the termed Fatals in the Killer Instinct series. In the game ClayFighter 63⅓ the Fatalities were parodied in the form of Claytality. "Fatalities" expanded into the shooter genre, most notably in the Gears of War series as "Executions".

 Variations 
In many games in the franchise there are different types of Fatalities and Finishers:

 Animality 
This finisher allows the player to morph into an animal and maul their opponent. This style of Fatality debuted in Mortal Kombat 3. According to Boon, his team "listened to what the players said about MKII and the Animalities that they thought were in there but really were not.

In order to perform an Animality, the player must first grant their opponent Mercy, the act which revives the opponent in lieu of delivering a final blow or performing a Fatality by restoring a small amount of health. Should the opponent be defeated again, an Animality may be performed.

 Babality 
Introduced in Mortal Kombat II, the Babality turns an opponent into an infant version of the character. Sometimes the opponent will wear a miniature version of the clothes they wore when fully-grown, complete with smaller versions of accessories such as Raiden's hat or Johnny Cage’s shades. In MK3 and its updates, the generic green "Babality!!" text and the sound of a baby crying used in MKII is replaced with pastel colored alphabet blocks and a short lullaby with the end portion of "Rock-a-bye-baby". Their initial appearance in Mortal Kombat II Revision 2.1 came with some glitches including one that allowed players to perform attacks after the Babality was performed.

 Brutality 
Introduced in Mortal Kombat Trilogy and the Super NES and Genesis versions of Ultimate Mortal Kombat 3, this finisher allowed players to perform a combo which would cause the opponent to explode. Brutalities were not very popular, as they were extremely difficult to accomplish, requiring the player to memorize and perform a special 11-hit combo.

This finisher did not appear in another game until Mortal Kombat: Shaolin Monks, in which it was not explicitly used as a finisher, but rather as a powerup. A move similar to the Brutality appeared in Mortal Kombat: Deception, in the form of a Fatality of Li Mei: her Fatality was to rapidly strike the opponent repeatedly, then to step back and pose as her opponent twitches for a moment, before exploding in a pile of gore. Brutalities make a return appearance in 2015's Mortal Kombat X, featured as enhanced versions of certain moves used as the finishing blow in the decisive round of a fight. They again appeared in 2019's Mortal Kombat 11, in which every character shares the Brutality "The Klassic".

 Faction Kill 
Appearing only in Mortal Kombat X, the winning player performs a unique fatality pertaining to which faction that player is part of in the game. Each faction has a set of five completely unique faction kills, however the player has to play continuously for one single faction to reveal every faction kill available to that particular faction, including one that is unlocked by a Faction War victory.

 Friendship 
The fighter performs an act of kindness, leaving the opponent unharmed at the end of the fight. These actions include Sub-Zero making a snowman, Noob Saibot throwing a bowling ball and hitting a few pins, Stryker holding out a stop sign as if to stop traffic and allowing all the other fighters to run past, or Jax taking out a jump rope and using it. Developers described the inclusion of Friendships as "a counter to all the blood and gore", saying they wanted a different aspect to the game. In MKII, Shao Kahn would announce "Friendship... Friendship?", while in MK3 and MK:T he would say "Friendship... Friendship, Again?" in a clearly disappointed or confused tone. While largely left out since MK3, and only alluded to in some characters' fatalities, it returned upon the release of Mortal Kombat 11: Aftermath as part of a free update to the main game. The updated Friendships are even more over-the-top, funny, and in some cases, heartwarming.

 Hara-Kiri 
The Hara-Kiri (which is Japanese for a certain type of ritual suicide, and literally means "belly cut"; even though Kenshi is the only character who uses the Hara-Kiri in this form) is a move in which the losing player kills them upon defeat at the end of the last match, rather than be finished off by their opponent. Examples of Hara-Kiris are Sindel performing a back flip and landing head first, Liu Kang internally combusting, Kabal stabbing himself between his eyes, and Darrius crushing his own head. It is the first time in the series in which the defeated player is allowed to perform a finishing move. The maneuver debuted in Deception but has not been included in any subsequent series installments.

Although it was called just a Fatality in-game, the first example of a suicidal finishing move in the series was Cyrax's "self-destruct" move from MK3 and Mortal Kombat Gold: Cyrax, a cyborg, enters a code on to his arm panel and moments later explodes along with his opponent in a manner reminiscent of the ending of the film Predator. Smoke went farther with his Fatality, since he destroys the whole planet (and every living being on it) with giant bombs. In MK Gold, Cyrax adopted this Fatality together with his own, while Smoke adopted Cyrax's self-destruct as his Hara-Kiri in Deception.

 Heroic Brutality 
Heroic Brutalities appear in the Midway/DC Comics crossover game Mortal Kombat vs. DC Universe as exclusive finishing moves for the DC heroes. While they are similar to Fatalities, a Heroic Brutality does not kill an opponent, since normally the DC heroes do not kill. These can range from somewhat gruesome like Green Lantern's, in which he crushes his enemy in a bubble of green energy breaking all of their bones, to rather comical such as The Flash's, where he lifts the enemy into the air with a tornado and punches them down.

 Kreate-A-Fatality 
For Mortal Kombat: Armageddon, the Fatality concept was completely revised. In all previous games, finishing moves were in the form of a button combo, activating a scripted animation sequence. For Armageddon, the old system was replaced with a new Kreate-A-Fatality, or "Kustom-Chain-Fatality" system. After defeating an opponent in two rounds (with default settings), players are given a limited amount of time to perform one of several violent moves (such as ripping an organ out) attributed to a button and direction combination. The time then resets and the player can perform a second move, but the time bar decreases more rapidly after each move. It is also possible to "fail" the Fatality by running out of time before performing a final finishing move (such as ripping the opponent's head off). Once the player reaches 10 chains, he/she must use a finisher or else the Fatality sequence will stop and the player will not receive a rank or reward. If time runs out before the player can end the chain with a final fatal move, no rank or reward is given and the Fatality is not counted, regardless of how many moves were completed.

This concept has been met with a mixed reaction, with some fans and critics preferring the more interactive nature and freedom of the Kreate-a-Fatality system, and others missing the previous games' character-specific ending moves and alternatives to killing the opponent. Originally, there were individual character-specific Kreate-a-Fatality moves for each character, but this feature was dropped, reportedly due to such a feat's infeasibility (especially in regards to the Kreate-A-Character option, which individual moves would not translate to). This kind of fatality has only been in this game.

 Stage Fatality 
Stage Fatalities brought environment interaction within the series, occurring when a player uses a part of the stage or map to execute a player. It is a finishing move that is not a standard character Fatality. Some examples of Stage Fatalities are having the victim fall into a pool of acid or a pit of spikes, or to be run over by a subway train; the stage then does not darken. Stage Fatalities are present in the series from the first Mortal Kombat, though are absent from Deadly Alliance.

Deception features more Stage Fatalities, renamed Death Traps, than any previous Mortal Kombat game. A special button combination is no longer required, as the opponent only needs to be either standing or hit in a particular spot on the stage. Unlike previous Stage Fatalities, Death Traps can be initiated anytime during a round and only require the opponent be hit into them, meaning an instant victory. However, if they are not executed in the decisive round, the fight does not end, going on to the next round. This action acts as a ring out. It was possible for some Death Traps to kill both fighters simultaneously, in which case the round went to the player who had taken the least damage, or Player 1 if both players had full life bars.

Traditional Stage Fatalities, seen since the original MK game through MK4, made a return in the new Mortal Kombat. Button combinations are once again used to perform Stage Fatalities.

 Miscellaneous Fergality: The Mega Drive/Genesis version of Mortal Kombat II featured an exclusive finishing move that allowed Raiden to transform his opponent into Probe Ltd. employee Fergus McGovern, who worked on that port of the game. This finisher could only be performed on the Armory stage.Multality: Mortal Kombat: Shaolin Monks features Multalities, which are Fatalities performed on multiple common enemies at one time.
Animalities and Brutalities were both rumored to be featured in MKII, but were only later added in MK3 and Mortal Kombat Trilogy, respectively. The rumored types of Fatalities that did not actually exist in any of the games included "Nudalities" and "Weirdalities", among others.Quitality''': In Mortal Kombat X and Mortal Kombat 11, if a player rage quits an online multiplayer match, their character will instantly die and their opponent is awarded a win.

 Notable Fatalities 
In December 1994, GamePro polled readers for their favorite Fatalities and published the results in their March 1995 issue. All were from MKII: Jax's "Arm Rip", Sub-Zero's "Ice Grenade", and Shang Tsung's "Soul Stealer".GamePro counted down their "12 Lamest Fatalities" from various fighting games in 2008. Those from Mortal Kombat were: Liu Kang's "Death by Arcade Machine" (MK3, #12); The Flash's "Tornado Slam" (MKvsDC, #11); Raiden's Friendship (MKII, #10); Jax's "Amazing Growing Man" (MK3, #9); Scorpion's and Rain's Animalities (UMK3/MKT, tied at #8); Sindel's "Killer Hair" (MK3, #7), Kano's "Stomach Pounce" (MKvsDC, #5); all Babalities (#3); and Kano's "Ripping Out an Invisible Heart" in the censored Super NES version of the first game (#1).Game Informer published a list of the series' best, worst, and "downright confusing" Fatalities in 2010.
 Best: Liu Kang's "Dragon" (MKII); Sub-Zero's "Spine Rip"  (MK); Reptile's "Head Snack" (MKII); Jade's "Head Gymnastics" (MK:D); Sektor's "Compactor" (MK3); Jax's "Arm Pull" (MKII); Dairou's "Ribs to the Eyes" (MK:D); and Sindel's "Scream" (MK3).
 Worst: Liu Kang's "Cartwheel" (MK); Kano's "Knee Stomp" (MKvsDC); Kitana's "Kiss of Death" (MKII); Kabal's "Inflating Head" and "Scary Face" (MK3); Rain's "Upside-Down Uppercut" (MKT); and Bo' Rai Cho's "Fart of Doom" (MK:D).
 Most confusing: Liu Kang's "Arcade Machine" (MK3); Jax's "Giant Stomp" (MK3); Johnny Cage's "Three Head Punch" (MKII); Cyrax's "Self-Destruct" (MK3); Darrius' "Rearranger" (MK:D); and Smoke's "Earth Detonation" (MK3).
 In 2010, ScrewAttack counted down their selections of the series' best and worst Fatalities.
Best: Reptile's "Facial Surgery" (MK4); Quan Chi's "Leg Beating" (MK4); Dairou's "Ribs in the Eyes" (MK:D); Cyrax's "Trash Compactor" (MK:DA); Kano's "Skeleton Remover" (MK3); Baraka's "Blades-in-the-Chest" (MKII); Scorpion's "Party Popper" (MK:DA); Johnny Cage's "Punching Bag" (MK:SM); Liu Kang's "Dragon Transformation" (MKII); and Sub-Zero's "ESRB-Maker" (MK).
 Worst: Tanya's "Neck Breaker" (MK4); Kabal's "Scary Face" (MK3); Sindel's Hara-Kiri (MK:D); Kenshi's "Eyeball-Popper" (MK:DA); Quan Chi "Makes You a Giraffe" (MK:DA); Raiden's "Accident" (MK:D); Reptile's Animality (UMK3); Motaro's "Head Yoink" (MKT): Liu Kang's "Cartwheel" (MK); and every finisher in MKvsDC.
 UGO.com counted down their top 50 "Most Gruesome Finishing Moves Ever" in video games in 2011. Those from Mortal Kombat were: Sub-Zero's "Spine Rip" (MK, #50); Johnny Cage's "Triple Uppercut" (MKII, #45); the Joker's "Last Joke" (MKvsDC, #40); Kung Lao's "Hat Slice" (MKII, #35); Johnny Cage's "Nutbuster" (MK:SM, #29); the "Pit" Fatality (MK, #22); Sektor's "Iron Clamp" (MK3, #15); Dairou's "Ribeyes" (MK:D, #5); and Smoke's "Armageddon" (MK3, #2).
 Prima Games, in 2014, counted down their selection of the top fifty Fatalities from the entire Mortal Kombat series, with the top ten being Baraka's "Lifting Stab" (MKII); Noob Saibot's "Make a Wish" (MK2011); Kitana's "Kiss of Death" (MKII); Johnny Cage's "Nut Buster" (MK:SM); Ermac's "Mind Over Splatter" (MK2011); the "Pit" Fatality (MK); Dairou's "Eye Stab" (MK:D); Kung Lao's "Blade Drag" (MK2011); Kano's "Heart Rip" (MK); and Sub-Zero's "Beheading, Complete with Spine" (MK).GameSpot posted their chronological selections of the ten best and worst Fatalities in Mortal Kombat history in 2022, in their commemoration of the series' 30th anniversary.
 Best: Sub-Zero's "Spine Rip" (MK); Kung Lao's "Hat Split" (MKII); Shang Tsung's Kintaro transformation (MKII); Quan Chi's "Shake a Leg" (MK4); Sub-Zero's "Pitch" (MK:D); Scorpion's "Nether Gate" (MK2011); Ermac's "Inner Workings" (MKX); Cassie Cage's "Selfie" (MKX); Shang Tsung's "Kondemned to the Damned" (MK11); and  D'Vorah's "New Species" (MK11).
 Worst: Liu Kang's "Cartwheel Uppercut" (MK); Jade's "Shaky Staff" (UMK3); Classic Sub-Zero's "Blackout" (UMK3); Quan Chi's "Neck Stretch" (MK:DA); Scorpion's "Only a Flesh Wound" (MK:DA); Ashrah's "Voodoo Doll" (MK:D); all Fatalities in MK: Armageddon; Kano's "Stomp, Drop, and Roll" (MKvsDC); Cassie Cage's "I <3 You" (MK11); and Skarlet's "Heart Condition" (MK11'').

References 

Mortal Kombat
Video games about death
Video game terminology
Violence in video games

de:Mortal Kombat#fatality
fr:Mortal Kombat#Achèvements